Rokunga (20 February 1914 – 12 July 1969) was a traditional writer and composer from Mizoram, India.

Musical compositions

He started composing songs in 1934. He is most well known for composing patriotic songs, traditional festive and Christmas songs. His remain the "most cherished" patriotic songs among the Mizo people. He composed over 127 songs, the most popular of which are:

Ro Min Relsak Ang Che (Aw nang kan Lal kan Pathian)
Ka Pianna Zoram Nuam
Raltiang i Kai Ve Ang
Kan Zotlang Ram Nuam

Popularity

He is one of the best known composers in Mizo literature. Kan Zotlang Ram Nuam (Our Fair Mizo Hill) is among the most popular songs; while Aw nang kan Lal kan Pathian is considered as the Mizo "national anthem".

Honours

He was posthumously honoured as Poet of the Century by Mizoram Millenium Celebration Committee in 2000.

In 2008 a life-sized statue was erected at City Park in Aizawl.

Legacy

In 1999 Rokunga Memorial Society (RMS) was established. The society gives annual Rokunga Award to a Mizo individual who uphold and exemplified the traditional Mizo ethics. The award carries INR 50,000 and, as of 2018, is funded by the Mizo daily news agency Vanglaini.

In 2016 Mizo Poetry Society was established in celebration of the birthday of Rokunga.

References 

Scholars from Mizoram
Mizo people
Indian male writers
Writers from Mizoram
1914 births
1969 deaths